Sailosi Tagicakibau (born 14 November 1982) is a rugby union footballer who has played at wing for London Irish and Wasps in the Aviva Premiership.

He spent the majority of his career with English Premiership side London Irish, making in excess of 150 appearances. By contrast, his brother, Saracens player Michael, has played for Fiji.

Personal life

Tagicakibau was born in Auckland, New Zealand. He has a Fijian father and Samoan mother. He was a talented all-rounder in his school years excelling at basketball, athletics and rugby union.

He is the eldest of five children, his brother Michael also plays professional rugby.

Prior to competing in professional rugby, he attended Papakura High School and Wesley College rugby schools in New Zealand.

Career

Club career

After college, he joined the  club and came under the guidance of the great All Black Kieran Crowley.

In November 2005, Tagicakibau signed with English Premiership club London Irish and his debut match for the Exiles was on 28 January 2006 against Gloucester.

After nine years at London Irish, Tagicakibau was loaned out to South African Super Rugby side the  2014 Super Rugby season. After he left London Irish, Sailosi signed for Premiership rivals Wasps from the 2014-15 season. In September 2016 Wasps announced that Tagicakibau had left the club, after they had released him from his contract, at his request, for family reasons.

National team

Sailosi made his debut for the Samoa Sevens national team in 2003, making several appearances and becoming a team staple. He has since represented Samoa at the 2007 World Cup held in France and at the 2011 World Cup hosted in his home country of New Zealand.

Other notable honours include his inclusion in the 2008 Pacific Islanders squad and the 2012 World Barbarians team.

References

1982 births
Living people
London Irish players
Wasps RFC players
New Zealand rugby union players
People educated at Wesley College, Auckland
Samoa international rugby union players
Pacific Islanders rugby union players
New Zealand people of I-Taukei Fijian descent
New Zealand sportspeople of Samoan descent
New Zealand people of Fijian descent
Expatriate rugby union players in England
New Zealand expatriate rugby union players
New Zealand expatriate sportspeople in England
Stormers players
Chiefs (rugby union) players
Taranaki rugby union players
Expatriate rugby union players in South Africa
New Zealand expatriate sportspeople in South Africa
Samoa international rugby sevens players
Male rugby sevens players
People from Auckland